Ağdaban is a village in the Kalbajar District of Azerbaijan. Ağdaban was one of two villages of Kalbajar forming an enclave inside of the Mardakert District of the former Nagorno-Karabakh Autonomous Oblast of the Azerbaijan SSR.

Aghdaban attack 
On March 26 1993, Armenian forces attacked Aghdaban

References

External links 
 

Populated places in Kalbajar District